Several commentators suggest that India has the potential to become a global superpower, a state with an extensive ability to exert influence or to project power in much of the world. Factors that contribute to a nation acquiring such clout can be economic, political, demographic, miltary and cultural.

Factors in favour

Economic factors

Size of the economy

In 2011, under the Manmohan Singh government, India was recognized as the third largest economy according to World Bank data. This was a significant accomplishment and a result of Manmohan Singh's policies. In 1991, India was ranked 17th in terms of its economy size, but Manmohan Singh's policies helped spur rapid growth that continued despite the global financial crisis. However, the momentum slowed down due to several civil society movements, such as Anna Hazare's anti-corruption movement, that impacted the congress government between 2011 and 2012. In 2015, Modi government's demonitization struck a lethal blow to the Indian economy.  Despite this, the country's large human and natural resources and educated middle class demographic helped it recover. In 2019, India was the 5th largest economy. The COVID-19 Pandemic dealt another blow to the Indian economy, but it was able to bounce back, unlike many western European countries. In 2020 India was the 6th largest economy.  In 2022, India overtook the United Kingdom as the world's fifth largest economy, which suffered greatly from COVID-19 and failed to fully recover. According to some economists, it may take India another 7 years to regain its third position, which it achieved in 2011 under the Manmohan Singh government. 
In terms of GDP (PPP) per capita India ranked at 125th largest economy in 2020, 2021, and 2022.  Its rank was 139 in terms of GDP (nominal) per capita. However, if per capita considerations are removed, by virtue of sheer size of India and its population, India jumps to the world's fifth largest in terms of GDP (nominal) and the third largest in terms of real GDP (PPP), after the United States of America and the People's Republic of China. It is noteworthy that this status was achieved in 2011 during the Manmohan Singh government.

Rate of growth
India experienced a period of rapid growth after 1991 due to the efforts of Narasimha Rao and Manmohan Singh to liberalize the economy. However, this growth was later slowed by instability at the center. Nevertheless, the Indian economy regained momentum during the Manmohan Singh government between 2004 and 2011, before slowing down once again as a result of the global financial crisis. In January 2015, India adopted a new way of calculating the GDP, suddenly appearing as the fastest-growing major economy in the world, overtaking China. When this new method was applied to the UPA rule under Manmoha Singh, the gowth during that period jumped to 10.08 percent, second highest since independence after 10.2% growth rate in 1988 .

Primary sector of industry
India, growing at 9% per year, is the world's second largest producer of food next to China. Food processing accounts for US$69.4 billion as gross income.

Secondary sector of industry
India is still relatively a small player in manufacturing when compared to many world leaders. Some trends suggest an improvement in the future, since the manufacturing sector is growing at 11-12%.

Tertiary and Quaternary sector of industry
India has a large and expanding Information Technology industry which serves customers throughout the world. Some have begun to describe India as a technology superpower. The IT industry provides software development services and technical consultancy throughout the world, strengthening large concerns such as Infosys and Tata Consultancy Services and also enables a host of global services located in India at highly competitive rates. Key to the growth of these industries are the availability of a large pool of highly trained, low cost, English speaking workers.

Science and technology

India is prioritising the development of a well-trained workforce with advanced English language skills to fit into the emerging knowledge economy. An example of India's scientific endeavours is the ISRO, the third National Space Agency to be founded in the world, following those of the  Soviet Union and the United States. It enabled India to become the third Asian nation to launch a satellite into orbit from an indigenously developed rocket after China and Japan, when the Rohini RS-1 lifted off in 1979. In January 2007, India became the fourth nation to complete atmospheric reentry In October 2008, India launched its first unmanned lunar probe, Chandrayaan 1, which operated until August 2009. On 14 November 2008, the Moon Impact Probe separated from the Chandrayaan orbiter and was made to strike the Moon near its south pole, making India the fourth country to reach the Moon's surface. The probe discoved widespread water molecules in lunar soil. On 24 September 2014, India became the fourth nation to have a satellite orbiting Mars. India is the first Asian nation to achieve this and the first  in the world to do so at the first attempt. India and the United States have increased mutual co-operation in space-travel related technologies, such as increasing the interoperability between Indian and US systems, and prospects for a commercial space launch agreement with India that would allow US satellites to be launched on Indian vehicles. India is also trying to join international R&D projects - e.g. it has recently joined the European Galileo GPS Project and the ITER for fusion energy club. India also holds a world record for placing 104 satellites in orbit by single launch. India recently launched Chandrayaan-2 mission to moon which had included a lander and rover. It also has a planned space mission called Gaganyaan (Indian Human spaceflight) to send a human to space by 2024. Planned space missions include Chandrayaan-3, Mars Orbiter Mission 2, Shukrayaan-1 and space exploration satellites as well as the ISRO space station to enter service by 2030. India has several  educational and research institutions of global repute, including the Indian Institute of Science, Indian Institute of Technology, National Institutes of Technology, Indian Institutes of Information Technology, IISER,BITS Pilani, Indian Institute of Management, Tata Institute of Fundamental Research and All India Institute of Medical Sciences.

Energy

India joined China in acquiring stakes in oil fields in the Middle East and Russia.

India is well-placed to transition from fossil fuels to other energy generation technologies, in line with global trends away from finite resources and harmful emissions due to its high solar insolation and density of consumers. For example, considering the costs of energy consumed for temperature control (a major factor influencing a region's energy intensity) and the fact that -  cooling load requirements, unlike heating, are roughly in phase with the sun's intensity, cooling from the excessive solar radiation could make great energetic (and hence economic) sense in the subcontinent, whenever the required technology becomes competitively cheaper.

India is constructing several power genration plants using nuclear power or hydroelectric-power. It has made civilian nuclear energy deals with the US and EU. As the site of 25% of the world's thorium reserves, India would be well-placed to use this alternative to uranium for nuclear power generation.

Mass transit system

India is developing modern mass rapid transit systems to meet present and future urban requirements. A modern metro rail system is already in place in the cities of Delhi, Mumbai, Chennai, Bangalore, Kolkata, Hyderabad, Kochi, Gurgaon, Jaipur and Lucknow. Similar mass transit systems are intended for Noida, Pune Bhopal, Nagpur, Indore, Kanpur and Ahmedabad. Indore is implementing GPS-enabled low floor buses in its Rapid Transport System.  The Indian rail network traverses the length and breadth of the country, covering a total length of 63,140 km (39,200 miles). It is one of the largest and busiest rail networks in the world, transporting over 9 billion passengers and over 350 million tonnes of freight annually. Its operations covers twenty-seven states and three Union territories and also links the neighbouring countries of Nepal, Bangladesh and Pakistan. India is heading towards the implementation of high-speed rail in the country. This should not mask the fact that there are public transport systems, such as buses, that are behind the standards met in some other countries.

Tourism

India continues to attract tourists with the attractions of its history, arts, music, culture and spiritual traditions. About 3.9 million tourists travelled to India in 2005, each spending an average of $1,470 , higher than in France, the most visited tourist destination in the world. Foreign visitors contributed over US$15.4 billion to the indian economy in 2005. Many travellers find the cultural diversity an enriching experience, despite hassles, inefficiency, pollution and overcrowding. Monuments like the Taj Mahal are among the many attractions of this land. As of 2006, Conde Nast Traveller ranked India the 4th most preferred travel destination. The Planning Commission expects 5.8 million tourists travelling to India by 2010. The World Travel and Tourism Council believes India's tourism industry will grow at 10% per annum in the next decade, making it lead the world in terms of growth.  Tourism contributes 6% of India's GDP and employs 40 million people, making it an important factor in India's economic growth. More than 8 million foreign tourists arrived in the year 2015 against 7.68 million in 2014
recording a growth of 4.4 percent over 2014.

Medical tourism in India
In 2014 an estimated 150,000 foreigners visited India for medical procedures, with the number projeczted to increasing by about 22 percent per year.

Geographic location 
India lies in the South Asian portion of the Indian Ocean and therefore is places advantageously for transoceanic commerce with and between continents.

In a speech in 1909, George Curzon, 1st Marquess Curzon of Kedleston (a former Viceroy of India) explained the importance of India to the British Empire:

Demographic factors

Large population
India has the world's largest population after China and has a positive Population Growth Rate. About half of its population is under 25, which suggests that economic growth should not be constrained in the next decades by contraction of the active workforce though aging. The United Nations has reported that India is projected to surpass China as the world’s most populous country in 2023.

Young population
Due to its high birth rate, India has a young population compared to more developed nations. Approximately 65% of its population is below the age of 35. In addition, declining fertility is beginning to reduce the youth dependency rate which may produce a demographic dividend. In the coming decades, while some of the powerful nations will witness a decrease in workforce numbers, India is expected to have an increase. For example, while Europe is well past its demographic window, the United States entered its own in 1970 (lasting until 2015), China entered its own in 1990 (and will last until 2025), India entered its own in 2010 (and it will last until 2050). In the words of Indian Scholar Rejaul Karim Laskar, "when greying population will be seen inhibiting economic growth of major countries, India will be brimming with youthful energy". Regionally, South Asia is supposed to maintain the youngest demographic profile after Africa and the Middle East, with the window extending up to the 2070s.

Global diaspora

More than 32 million Indians live across the globe. Under fair opportunities, they have become socio-economically successful— especially in the US and the UK where they are the highest earning ethnic demographic.

Foreign language skills
The global importance of the English language may be in transition but the large number of non-native English speakers means that it cannot be discounted as an enabler in global trade. India has the world's largest number of people able to understand and/or speak English. It claims one of the largest workforces of engineers, doctors and other key professionals that use English. It has the 2nd largest population of "fluent English" speakers, second only to the United States, with estimates ranging from 150 to 250 million speakers, and is expected to have the largest in the coming decades. Indians also learn other major world languages.

Political factors

Democratic republicanism
India is the world's largest democratic republic, four times bigger than the next largest (the United States). It has so far been successful politically, especially considering its functionality despite its difficult ethnic composition. The fact that India is a democracy has improved its relations with other democratic nations and significantly improved its ties with the majority of the nations in the developed world.

Candidacy for Security Council
India has been pressing for permanent membership of the United Nations Security Council (as part of the G4 nations) but with a clause that it won't exercise its veto for the next 15 years. It has received backing from the United States, France, Russia, and the United Kingdom. However, China's stance on India's candidacy has been unclear.

Foreign relations

India has developed relationships with the world powers like the United Kingdom, the European Union, Japan, Russia, and the United States. It also developed relationships with the African Union (particularly South Africa), the Arab World, Southeast Asia, Israel and South American nations (particularly Brazil). To make the environment favourable for economic growth, India is investing on its relations with China.  It has significantly boosted its image among Western nations and signed a civilian nuclear deal with the United States in March 2006. It is also working for better relationships with Pakistan.

Role in international politics
Historically, India was one of the founding members of Non-Aligned Movement and had good relationships with Soviet Union and other parts of western world. It played regional roles in South Asian affairs, e.g. its use of the Indian Peace Keeping Force in the Bangladesh Liberation War and in Sri Lanka. It took a leading initiative to improve relations between African and Asian countries. India is an active member of the Commonwealth and the WTO. The evolving economic integration politics in the West and in Asia is influencing the Indian mood to slowly swing in favour of integration with the global economy.  Currently, India's political moves are being influenced by economic imperatives. New Delhi is also being observed to slowly, cautiously, and often hesitantly, step into the uncharted role of becoming one of the two major seats of political power in Asia, the other being at Beijing. Some enlightened thinkers from the subcontinent have also envisioned, over the long run, a South Asian version of free trade zone and even a Union, where the South Asian nations relinquish all past animosities and move to make economic growth a pan subcontinental phenomenon.

Multipolarity
A new and highly controversial geopolitical strategy, being debated in the West, is whether India should be trusted/helped to become an economically strong democratic citizen of the world, and be used to balance the powerful but non-democratic forces, to insure a more stable world.  Generally speaking, it is discussed in the context of adopting a policy of offshore balancing on the part of the United States.

Military factors

Total strength
The Indian Armed Forces, India's main defence organisation, consists of two main branches: the core Military of India and the Indian Paramilitary Forces. The Military of India maintains the largest active duty force in the world as of 2020, while the Indian Paramilitary Forces, over a million strong, is the second largest paramilitary force in the world. Combined, the total armed forces of India are 2,414,700 strong, the world's third largest defence force.

Army
The Army of India, as the Indian army was called under British rule before 1947, played a crucial role in checking the advance of Imperial Japan into South Asia during World War II. It also played a leading role in the liberation of Bangladesh in 1971. Today, the Indian Army is the world's largest army in total numbers of armed personnel.

Air force
The Indian Air Force is the fourth largest air force in the world. India recently inducted its second indigenously manufactured combat aircraft. India is also developing the fifth generation stealth aircraft.

Navy
The Indian Navy is the world's fifth largest navy. It is considered to have blue-water capabilities with sophisticated missile-capable warships, aircraft carrier, advanced submarines and the latest aircraft in its inventory, along with a significant use of state of the art technology that is indigenously manufactured.

Integrated Guided Missile Development Program

India started the Integrated Guided Missile Development Program (IGMDP) to be a self-reliant nation in missile development. The IGMDP program includes five missiles like the Prithvi and Agni of ballistic missiles, surface to air missiles Trishul and Akash and also the anti tank Nag missile. Prithvi and Agni missiles are inducted into the armed forces and form the basis of Indian nuclear second strike capability. Trishul missile is declared a technology demonstrator. The Akash (Sky) is in service with the Indian Army and the Indian Air Force. While Nag and Helina missiles are undergoing user trials. Recently, a new weapons system, the beyond visual range air-to-air Astra missile was added to the project. Also India has fielded many modern missiles like the anti ballistic missiles like the AAD and PAD along with submarine launched ballistic missiles for its Arihant class of nuclear ballistic submarines. The expertise in developing these missiles has helped Indian scientists to contribute to joint weapon development programs like the Brahmos and Barak-II. India is also developing long range cruise missiles similar to the Tomahawk class of missiles called Nirbhay. There are reports of India developing an intercontinental ballistic missile beyond the range of ten thousand kilometres.  India is self-reliant in missile technology.

Nuclear weapons
India has possessed nuclear weapons since 1974, when it did the Pokharan I nuclear tests, and the means to deliver them over long distances. However, India is not a signatory to the Nuclear Non-Proliferation Treaty (on grounds of security concerns and that India condemns the NPT as discriminatory).

Arms imports
India is currently the world's 2nd largest arms importer as of the end of 2019, spending an estimated US$16.97 billion in 2004. India has made military technology deals with the Russian Federation, the U.S., Israel and the EU.

Current major roles
The Indian Armed Forces plays a crucial role in anti-terrorist activities and maintaining law and order in the disputed Kashmir region. India has also participated in several United Nations peace-keeping missions, currently being the largest contributor to UN peace keeping force and is the second-largest contributor to the United Nations Democracy Fund behind the USA.

History

India has a long history of cultural dialogue with many regions of the world, especially within Asia, where its cultural influence has spread through the philosophy of religions like Jainism, Buddhism, Hinduism, Sikhism, etc. – particularly in East and Southeast Asia. Many religions with origins outside the Indian subcontinent – Islam, Christianity, Judaism, Zoroastrianism, Baháʼí Faith - have found followers in India. Indian culture has spread to foreign lands through wandering traders, philosophers, and migration

Cinema

India's film industry produces more feature films than any other. In a year, it sold 3.6 billion tickets, more than any other film industry in the world (In comparison, Hollywood sold 2.6 billion tickets). The cinemas play a major role in spreading Indian culture worldwide.  Indian cinema transcended its boundaries from the days of film Awara, a great hit in Russia. Bollywood films are seen in central and west Asia. Indian films have also found audience in eastern societies. India's film industry is now becoming increasingly popular in Western society, with Bollywood festivals occurring in numerous cities and Bollywood dance groups performing in New Year's Eve celebrations, treatment which other non-English film industries generally do not receive.

Unity in diversity of world view

India has a multi-ethnic, multi-lingual and multi-religious society living together. The subcontinent's long and diverse history has given it a unique eclectic culture. It is often associated with spirituality. Thanks to its history of both indigenous and foreign influences - like the ancient Indian religions (Buddhism, Hinduism, Jainism and Sikhism) and the ancient Middle East Asian schools of thought (Abrahamic - Islam, Christianity, Judaism etc.) - the current Indian civilizational psyche is evolving into a complex mix of them - sometimes a superposition of religious philosophies with acceptance of the conflicting cosmologies, sometimes striking a middle ground, and sometimes taking the practical attitude - popular with the young - of "filtering the common best, and leaving the rest", thus leading to the creation of many syncretic mix of faiths (such as Sai Baba of Shirdi). Since Independence, India has regained its more progressive schools of thought, like - democracy, secularism, rule of law, esteem for human rights, rational deductive reasoning, development of Science and Technology, etc. - are making slow but steady inroads into the collective modern Indian psyche. India's diversity forces it to evolve strong foundations of tolerance and pluralism, or face break-up. The Indian public is now also accepting modern western influences in their society and media - and what is emerging is a confluence of its past local culture with the new western culture ("Social Globalisation"). For some futuristic social thinkers, the miscegenation of diverse ancient culture with modernity, spirituality with science/technology, Eastern with Western world-view is potentially making India a social laboratory for the evolution of futuristic global-unity consciousness.

Points against the rise of India as a superpower

Political obstacles

Cost of democratic republicanism
Democratic republicanism has its value, more so in a multi-ethnic country like India. However, the applicability of the "theoretical" virtues of republicanism on a country like India is sometimes questioned. Some thinkers consider India's diverse democracy to levy a huge tax on its economy. The Indian government has to consider many interest groups before decision making. However, India is relatively a much younger republic when compared to other major democracies. Moreover, it is predicted that in the long run, India being a democracy will provide it an edge over non-democratic competitors like China.

Insurgency
India has had significant successes with quelling many insurgencies, most prominently the Punjab insurgency (Khalistan) and the surrender of large sections of insurgent outfits like the United Liberation Front of Asom in 1992 and National Liberation Front of Tripura in 2000–2001. However, the Indian government has acknowledged that there has been a dramatic increase in support for the Maoists (Naxalite) insurgency in the last decade. Maoist rebels have increased their influence over the last 10 years, especially in regions near Nepal, particularly by targeting and gaining support from poor villages in India. The boom in support appears to have been also boosted by the successes of the nearly 10-year-old Maoist rebellion in Nepal. India's government has recently taken a new stance on the Maoist insurgency, pulling the affected states together to co-ordinate their response. It says it will combine improved policing with socio-economic measures to defuse grievances that fuel the Maoist cause.

Disputes
India's growth is impeded by disputes with its neighbouring China and Pakistan (over historical border and ideological issues) and disputes with Bangladesh (over water availability) and hence, India's neighbours such as China and Pakistan remain distrustful towards India. It is also occasionally burdened with instability issues within some localised-regions of the subcontinent. In an effort to reduce political tension and increase economic co-operation, in recent years, India has improved its relations with its neighbours.

Lack of international representation
India is not a permanent member of the UNSC, although currently, it is one of the four-nations group actively seeking a permanent seat in the council. Thus India lacks the ability to extend its influence or ideas on international events in the way superpowers do.

Economic obstacles

Subsistence Farming
As of 2020, according to the World Bank, approximately 41.49% of India's total workforce are employed in the agricultural sector. Compared with most developed economies such as the United States, United Kingdom, and Germany, the percentage is around 1%. This figure is gradually declining. However, it will still require decades until the percentage matches the figures of other leading economies. According to the National Institute of Open Schooling, a majority of farmers in India practises subsistence farming. This means farming for own consumption. In other words, the entire production is largely consumed by the farmers and their family and they do not have any surplus to sell in the market. In this type of farming, landholdings
are small and fragmented. Cultivation techniques are primitive and simple. In other words, there is a total absence of modern equipments like tractors and farm inputs like chemical fertilizers, insecticides and pesticides. In this farming, farmers mostly cultivate cereals along with oil seeds, pulses, vegetables and sugarcane.

Poverty
As of 2011, approximately 21.9%  of India's population lived below poverty line. Poverty also begets child labour.  Various reforms, including mass employment schemes have been undertaken by the government to tackle this problem, and India has been quite successful in reducing its share of poverty. The number of people living on $1 a day is expected to fall in South Asia from 41.5 per cent in 1990 to 16.4 per cent until 2015. In 2022, India has almost eradicated extreme poverty. However, the issue of poverty in India is far from resolved. There is consensus among economists that overall poverty in India has declined, the extent of poverty reduction is often debated. The economic reforms of the early 1990s were followed by rates of high economic growth. Its effect on poverty remain controversial, and the official numbers published by the Government of India, showing a reduction of poverty from 36% (1993–94) to 26% (1999 – 00), to 22% (2004–05), have been challenged both for allegedly showing too little and too much poverty reduction. As of 2011, 86.8% of Indians live on less than $5.50 a day by purchasing power parity. While there is a consensus on the fact that liberalisation has led to a reduction of income poverty, the picture is not so clear if one considers other non-pecuniary dimensions (such as health, education, crime and access to infrastructure). With the rapid economic growth that India is experiencing, it is likely that a significant fraction of the rural population will continue to migrate toward cities, making the issue of urban poverty more significant in the long run. Economist Pravin Visaria has defended the validity of many of the statistics that demonstrated the reduction in overall poverty in India. He insisted that the 1999-2000 survey was well designed and supervised, and he further defended that just because the numbers did not appear to fit preconceived notions about poverty in India, they should not be dismissed outright. Nicholas Stern, vice-president of the World Bank, has published defences of the poverty reduction statistics. He argues that increasing globalisation and investment opportunities have contributed significantly to the reduction of poverty in the country. India, has shown one of the clearest co-relation trends of globalisation with the accelerated rise in per-capita income.

Infrastructure
Basic infrastructure in India such as roads, power grid, water, communications infrastructure, and housing are often below standards, and not catching up with the tune of its economic progress. Continued poor infrastructure might serve as a bottleneck to further economic development. The 2012 India blackouts, which affected millions, was a result of such problems. The government is, however, improving the infrastructure, such as expanding the freeway and highway system and bringing it up to global standards. As of 2005, India only had 8,811.5 km of expressways, while China have 149,600 km of expressways, respectively. Even so, India has more than 
151,000 km of National Highways and the world's second largest road network, plus another 186,528 kilometres (115,903 mi) of state highways.

Inflation and overheating
According to a 2006's report, despite India's growth spurt of 8% p.a. in recent years, its sustainable pace is still much lower than China's, which puts its economy more at risk of overheating and rising inflation. The Reserve Bank of India (RBI) has acknowledged the risk of overheating and has been tightening monetary policy steadily. It is debatable whether this alone will be sufficient to ease inflationary pressures. The economy is running near or above capacity, and the RBI has noted that production must rise at a pace sufficient to match overall GDP growth if further inflationary pressures are to be avoided.  The Indian government has said that much of the rise in inflation recently can be attributed to short-term supply constraints, such as a shortage of key foodstuffs thanks to an erratic summer monsoon.

Energy dependence and costs
India heavily depends on foreign oil - a phenomenon likely to continue until non-fossil/renewable energy technology becomes economically viable in the country. To avert an energy crisis, India is desperately seeking alternate means of energy. India can sustain its growth to higher trajectories only by the co-operation of other countries. As for now, India is energetically expensive since India has to import over 70% of its energy, thus making costs of comforts - like personal car or even air conditioning - extremely high. It is however, steadily combating its energy issues.

Health
India's health scenario is dismal with diseases and malnutrition constantly affecting the poorest quarter of the populace. Mortality is still relatively high and the bane of AIDS is spreading quickly. According to a report of United Nations Development Programme, India has the 3rd highest population living with AIDS/HIV and its economy might suffer a setback if it does not check the problem of the virus' spread. It is estimated that India's economic growth will decline by 0.86 percentage annually if the AIDS problem is not properly dealt with. To improve the situation, a number of projects such as the building of hospital chains (like the Apollo Hospitals, amongst others) has laid the foundation for a health system that matches global standards. However, these hospitals are sometimes used by foreigners as a cheap yet effective source of health services and much remains to be done for India's very poor.

Literacy
As per the 2011 India census, India's national literacy is only 74.04% (2011). Literacy drive is spreading slowly to other states. India's youth (age 15 to 24) literacy rate was 76.4% between 2000 and 2004.  At current rates India will take no less than 20 years for a literacy of 95%. Literacy in India is not homogeneous, some states in India have higher literacy rates than others. Kerala, a south-Indian state widely recognised as the most well-educated state in India, recorded a literacy rate of 93.9% in 2011. On the other hand, the north-Indian state of Bihar lags behind with 63.8%. India's adult literacy rates (61.3% in 2002), is just a little better compared to other nations in South Asia except Sri Lanka's 91.7%, with Nepal next at 44%, Pakistan at 41.5% and Bangladesh the lowest at 41.1%.

Climate and environmental problems
The majority of India lies in the tropical climate zone, which may have a negative impact on its agricultural and overall economic development.  The climate thesis of economic development was first argued by Adam Smith and recently by David Landes in his The Wealth and Poverty of Nations. Tropical areas generally average enough rainfall, but the timing is often irregular and unpredictable. The rain drops are large and the rate of fall often torrential. One answer to irregular moisture is storage and irrigation, but this is countered in these regions by incredibly high rates of evaporation. In the Agra region of India, for example, rainfall exceeds the needs of local agriculture for only two months in the year, and the excess held in the soil in those wet months dries up in only three weeks.  Tropical zones are also more prone to endemic water-borne and parasitic diseases such as cholera and malaria. As a result of climate change, the Gangotri Glacier, among others, is receding. Also, of the 3 million premature deaths in the world that occur each year due to outdoor and indoor air pollution, the highest number are assessed to occur in India.

Social divide
The problem of India's social divide is often linked to its centuries-old caste system. In an attempt to eliminate the caste system, the Indian government has introduced special quotas for low-caste Indians in educational institutions and jobs. The measure is with the motive of helping lower-caste Indians to pursue higher education and thereby elevate their standard of life.

See also

 Indosphere
 Economy of India
 Culture of India
 Foreign relations of India
 Tourism in India
 Military of India
 History of India

References

Further reading
India: The next knowledge superpower 
India Economy grows at torrid pace - New York Times
Indian economy on take-off stage with demographic bonus
India Awakens by Michael Elliott (Time.com)
The New India, and the Old One
India's Economic Contrasts
A New World Economy by Businessweek
China and India by Businessweek
India: Emerging Power by Stephen P. Cohen
India 2020 by A.P.J. Abdul Kalam, Y.S. Rajan
India as an Emerging Power by Sumit Ganguly
Indian Economy: Can India become the next Financial Power?

External links

Articles
India: Towards the Millennium Development Goals, UN 
The Changing Geopolitical Landscape by National Intelligence Council 
Prospects for China and India in the 21st Century, Marvin Cetron, World future Society Conference, 2004. 
China and India Hold World in Balance 
India and the World: Balancing Agenda
India: the Next Economic Giant, 2004, By Lowy Institute, Australia.
Newsweek Coverpage on India
Businessweek on India's attractiveness
Socioeconomic statistics and demographics of Asians in America
New World-Order Paradigm: The Best of the West Agrees It's Moving East 
Relocating to India
 India, China, and the United States: A Delicate Balance
Made for India
China and India - The Future of Investors
A Race to the Future
Indians on India Vision
What's Behind Asia's Gold Rush? A Health and Demographic analysis by Harvard School of Public Health

China, India Superpower - Not so fast.
Why India lags behind China
Does demography advantage India?
The end of Gandhi's dream: India's economic boom and bust
Why Has China's Economy Taken Off Faster than India's? A Research Paper by Harvard and Tsingua University faculties, presented at Stanford Center for International Development
India is China's economic equal? Bah!

Books
The World Is Flat: A Brief History of the Twenty-First Century Thomas L. Friedman 
Three Billion New Capitalists by Clyde Prestowitz 
India Unbound: The Social and Economic Revolution from Independence to the Global Information Age by Gurcharan Das
India: An Investor's Guide to the Next Economic Superpower by Aaron Chaze
Social Problems in India/B.K. Prasad 
Energy Crisis in India by M. G. Mehetre

Media
World is Flat, T. Friedman, Colloquium Recording at Massachusetts Institute of Technology.
One Land, two planets (listen)

Websites
An information portal on India's rising status

Emerging power
21st century
Superpowers
Military terminology